Warriewood Square (previously known as Centro Warriewood) is a shopping centre in the suburb of Warriewood in the Northern Beaches region of Sydney.

Transport 
Warriewood Square has bus connections to the Sydney CBD and the Northern Beaches, as well as local surrounding suburbs. It is served by Keolis Downer Northern Beaches which includes the B-Line services. The majority of the bus service are located on Jacksons Road and Pittwater Road. There is no railway station at Warriewood; the nearest station is located at Chatswood.

Warriewood Square also has a multi level car park with 1,450 spaces.

History
Warriewood Square opened in 1981 and included over 30 stores. The centre included a Kmart, Coles and Franklins. In March 1996, the centre was bought by Centro Properties Group and rebranded Centro Warriewood.  In 1999 the centre was redeveloped and 55 new stores were added and new shaded parking was added. Franklins closed in 2001 and was replaced by Woolworths. It was renamed back to Warriewood Square on 8 November 2014.

Recent development
In 2015 Vicinity Centres began work on the $84 million redevelopment which extended Warriewood Square by 7,500m² and included a new multi-storey carpark. The redevelopment was completed on June 23, 2016 and consists of:
 Aldi Supermarket
 Two mini majors - Rebel Sport (then known as Amart Sports) and Cotton On
 New look Kmart and an expanded Woolworths
 Around 35 new stores
 An additional 1400+ convenient parking spaces
As a result, Warriewood Square is the second largest shopping centre on the Northern Beaches with Westfield Warringah Mall being the largest.

Tenants
Warriewood Square has 30,277m² of floor space. The major retailers include Kmart, Aldi, Coles, Woolworths, Cotton On, JB Hi-Fi and Rebel.

References

External links
 Warriewood Square Official Website

Shopping centres in Sydney
Shopping malls established in 1981
1981 establishments in Australia